Henry Boltinoff (February 19, 1914 – April 26, 2001) was an American cartoonist who worked for both comic strips and comic books. He was a prolific cartoonist and drew many of the humor and filler strips that appeared in National Periodical comics from the 1940s through the 1960s.

Biography

Comic books 
Born in New York City, Boltinoff created numerous humor features for DC Comics, where his brother Murray Boltinoff was an editor. His most prominent creation for DC was "Dover & Clover" which debuted in More Fun Comics #94 (Nov. 1943). Boltinoff's other features include "Abdul the Fire Eater", "Bebe", "Billy", "Buck Skinner", "Cap's Hobby Center", "Casey the Cop", "Charlie Cannonball", "Chief Hot Foot", "Cora the Carhop", "Dexter", "Doctor Floogle", "Doctor Rocket", "Elvin", "Freddie the Frogman", "Hamid the Hypnotist", "Homer", "Honey in Hollywood", "Hy the Spy", "Hy Wire", "Jail Jests", "Jerry the Jitterbug", "King Kale", "Lefty Looie", "Lem 'n' Lime", "Lionel and His Lions", "Little Pete", "Little Pocahontas", "Lucky", "The Magic Genie", "Moolah the Mystic", "No-Chance Charley", "Ollie", "On the Set", "Peg", "Peter Puptent", "Prehistoric Fun", "Professor Eureka", "Sagebrush Sam", "Shorty", "Stan", "Super-Turtle", "Tricksy the World's Greatest Stunt Man" and "Warden Willis". These were usually lettered by Gaspar Saladino. Boltinoff's final creation for DC was "Cap's Hobby Hints". In 1969, he became the writer of the Date with Debbi and Swing with Scooter titles.

Magazine Cartoons

Boltinoff started doing magazine cartoons in the early forties. He contributed to all of the mid range magazines, such as Look, Collier's, The Saturday Evening Post, True, Liberty, The American Legion, Sunday newspaper magazines such as This Week, Today, The American Weekly, Parade and almost every other general interest magazine, from The Progressive Farmer to The Ford Times. He also sold a lot of cartoons to special cartoon magazines, such as 1000 Jokes, Judge and Gags.For Judge he did a monthly one page feature identifying character types between 1944 and 1947 and for King Features' Pictorial Review he had a regular page of gags under the title "Gags and Gals". All in all he was one of the best selling cartoonists in the forties and into the fifties. Even while doing his filler strips for DC, his cartoons kept appearing in magazines such as Boy's Life and many of the low rent Humorama titles.

Comic strips and panels 
Boltinoff was a regular contributor to This and That (a daily cartoon panel from the George Matthew Adams syndicate), Nubbin (1970 - 1986), This Funny World (a daily cartoon panel from the McNaught syndicate) and Laff-A-Day (a daily cartoon panel from King Features). He also had his own panels: Woody Forrest (1960), Stoker the Broker (1960), and Hocus-Focus through 2001. He received the National Cartoonists Society's Newspaper Panel Cartoon Award in 1981 and also received their Humor Comic Book Award for 1970.

Hocus-Focus may have been Boltinoff's best-known work. The King Features Syndicate feature, which was started c. 1965 by Harold Kaufmann, includes two similar panels with six differences between them. It continues to run in over 300 newspapers.

Bibliography

DC Comics
 
 All Funny Comics #1–23 (Dover and Clover) (1943–1948) 
 The Best of DC #45 (1984)  
 Binky #77 (1971)  
 Binky's Buddies #11–12 (1970)  
 Date with Debbi #3–5, 14 (1969–1971)  
 Detective Comics #158, 163, 165, 171 (Dover and Clover) (1950–1951)
 More Fun Comics #94–100, 102–127 (Dover and Clover) (1943–1947)
 Star Spangled Comics #23, 24, 96 (1943–1949)  
 Swing with Scooter #17–18, 29, 31 (1969–1970)  
 World's Best Comics #1 (1941)  
 World's Finest Comics #2–4, 12, 67 (1941–1953)

References

External links
 
 Hocus Focus at King Features
 Henry Boltinoff and The Henry Boltinoff Hall of Fame Gallery at Mike's Amazing World of DC Comics
 
Billy Ireland Cartoon Library & Museum Art Database

1914 births
2001 deaths
20th-century American artists
21st-century American artists
American comic strip cartoonists
American comics writers
Artists from New York City
DC Comics people
Golden Age comics creators
Inkpot Award winners
Silver Age comics creators